This article lists some of the sales and charts records and achievements of Michael Jackson (1958–2009), an American singer, songwriter, and dancer. Jackson's success during his peak in the 1980s and 1990s included a number of notable statistical accomplishments. He is the most awarded recording artist in the history of popular music and is recognized as the "Most Successful Entertainer of All Time" by Guinness World Records selling an estimated 1 billion records around the world.

Data for U.S. sales comes largely from Billboard magazine and the Recording Industry Association of America (RIAA).

Selected countries

US chart records and achievements

 Jackson (aged 11 years, 155 days or 11 years, 5 months, and 2 days) is the youngest vocalist ever to top the Hot 100. As part of the Jackson 5, he topped the charts with "I Want You Back" on the week of January 31, 1970.
Jackson's Thriller (1982) remained at the top on the Billboard 200 album chart for thirty-seven weeks, setting a record for the longest run at number one by a studio album. It is only one of two albums to have sold more copies in the United States than any other in two separate years, topping the sales charts in 1983 and 1984.
Thriller is currently the second best-selling album of all time in the United States and the second most certified album after the Eagles' Their Greatest Hits (1971-1975), with total units of 34 million sold to date.
Jackson's Bad (1987) remained at top 5 on the Billboard 200 album chart for thirty-eight weeks, setting a record for the longest run at top five by an album from a male solo artist.
 In July 2009, three of Jackson's albums (Number Ones, The Essential Michael Jackson and Thriller) claimed the top three positions on Billboard's Top Pop Catalog Albums and Top Comprehensive Albums charts in the week following the singer's death. marking the first time any catalog album outsold the number one album on the Billboard 200. Additionally, eight of the top nine positions on Top Pop Catalog Albums were owned by Jackson, with a ninth held by a Jackson 5 hits collection. This made Jackson the only solo artist to achieve such feat.
 Jackson was the first artist to launch seven top ten singles off one album.
 Jackson's Bad is only one of two albums where five singles off one album topped the Billboard Hot 100.
 Jackson became the first recording artist to land number one singles in three decades after "Black or White" topped the Billboard Hot 100 in December 1991. His first number-one single, "Ben", topped the Billboard Hot 100 in October 1972.
 Jackson became the first artist to simultaneously top Billboard's album chart and the number one single on both the pop and R&B charts, with Thriller and "Billie Jean" in the week of March 5, 1983.
 Jackson had more number-one singles than any other recording artist in the 1980s with nine singles.
 Jackson's "You Are Not Alone" made him the first artist to have a song debut atop the Billboard Hot 100 in September 1995.
 Jackson holds the record of longest span of number ones for a male act in the Billboard Hot 100 with a span of 25 years and seven months. 
 Jackson has had 13 number-one singles on Billboard's Hot 100, making him the male artist with most No. 1 Hits in the Hot 100 era. Including Pre- Hot 100, Jackson follows Elvis Presley for the most number ones by a male artist and ranks fifth overall. 
 Jackson has 30 top ten singles on the Billboard Hot 100, with Drake, Madonna, the Beatles, and Rihanna having more.
 Jackson currently holds a record for the longest span of top forty singles on the Billboard Hot 100 in a span of 46 years and eight months, with his debuting solo single, "Got to Be There", entering the chart on November 6, 1971, and his posthumous duet with Drake, "Don't Matter to Me", first charting on July 14, 2018.
 Jackson is the only act to have top 10 hits on the Billboard Hot 100 across five consecutive decades (1970s–2010s) and six consecutive decades including his work with the Jackson 5 (1960s–2010s) when "I Want You Back" charted at No. 8 on the week of December 27, 1969, in the Billboard Hot 100.
 At the 1984 Grammys, Thriller earned Michael 7 Grammy awards with Jackson winning an eighth for his contribution to the E.T. the Extra-Terrestrial soundtrack, the most won by an artist in a single year.
 Jackson currently holds the record for the most wins by a male artist at the American Music Awards with 26.

Jackson's US number ones
Michael Jackson had 13 number one hits on the Billboard Hot 100 charts.

Jackson's US Top 10 Hits
Michael Jackson had 28 Top 10 hits on the Billboard Hot 100 charts while living, and to date has two posthumous Top 10 entries.

Jackson's US R&B number ones
Michael Jackson had 16 number one hits on the Billboard R&B charts.

UK chart records and achievements
 Jackson had the most Top 40 hits in the UK Singles Chart in one year, 19 in 2006. Each of the 19 songs was collectors' rereleases of previous Jackson hits, issued weekly as part of a 20-single promotion (the first of the singles was ineligible to chart due to its packaging). Of these singles, "Billie Jean" reached the highest position on the UK chart (#11), and "Jam" remained on the chart for the longest stretch (13 weeks).
 Jackson had 44 Top 10 hits in the UK Singles Chart. Elvis Presley has the most, with 77.
 Jackson's Thriller and Bad are the two highest-selling albums by a male solo artist in UK history. Besides Jackson, only Queen, with the 1st- and 7th-best-selling albums, has multiple entries in the top twenty.
 Jackson is the only artist to have 3 albums (Thriller, Bad and Number Ones) certified 10× Platinum or more in the UK.
 Bad was the fastest-selling album in the UK with sales of 350,000 copies during the first week of its release (it is now the eleventh). 
 In the second week following his death, Jackson had 13 songs in the UK Top 40, and 5 albums in the Top 10, including the top-selling album.

Jackson's UK number ones
Michael Jackson had seven number one hits on the UK Singles Charts.

French chart records and achievements
 Jackson had four diamond albums in France. They are Thriller, Bad, Dangerous, and HIStory.
 Jackson had 22 top ten hits on the French Top 100 Singles charts.
 Jackson had 36 top 40 hits on the Top 100 Singles charts.

Jackson's French number ones
Michael Jackson had eight number one hits on the Top 100 Singles charts.

Spanish chart records and achievements
 Jackson had 35 top 20 hits on the Top 20 Singles charts.
 Jackson had 29 top ten hits on the Top 20 Singles charts.

Jackson's Spanish number ones
Michael Jackson had 21 number one hits on the Top 20 Singles charts.

Canadian chart records and achievements
 Jackson had five number-one albums in Canada: Thriller, Bad, HIStory, Number Ones and This Is It.
 Jackson had three singles that earned at least one platinum certification in Canada: "Billie Jean," "Beat It," and "Say Say Say."
 Jackson's Thriller is the highest-selling album in Canadian music history, the first and only album to obtain Triple Diamond certification. 
 Jackson had 29 top 20 hits on the Top 50 Singles charts.
 Jackson had 20 top ten hits on the Top 50 Singles charts.

Jackson's Canadian number ones
Michael Jackson had five number-one hits on the Top 50 Singles charts.

Australian chart records and achievements
 Jackson had eight albums in Australia that earned platinum or multi-platinum certifications: Off the Wall, Thriller, Bad, Dangerous, HIStory, Invincible, Number Ones, and The Essential Michael Jackson.
 Jackson had 27 top 20 hits on the Top 100 Singles charts.
 Jackson had 20 top ten hits on the Top 100 Singles charts.

Jackson's Australian number ones
Michael Jackson had four number one hits on the Top 100 Singles charts.

Norwegian chart records and achievements
 Jackson had three singles that earned a gold certification in Norway: "Earth Song," "They Don't Care About Us," and "You Rock My World."
 Jackson had 21 top ten hits on the Top 20 Singles charts.

Jackson's Norwegian number ones
Michael Jackson had five number one hits on the Top 20 Singles charts.

Swiss chart records and achievements
 Jackson had 24 top ten hits on the Top 100 Singles chart.
 Jackson had 21 top ten hits on the Top 20 Singles charts.

Jackson's Swiss number ones
Michael Jackson had four number one hits on the Top 100 Singles charts.

New Zealand chart records and achievements
 Jackson had 24 top ten hits on the Top 100 Singles charts.

Jackson's New Zealand number ones
Michael Jackson had eight number one hits on the Top 100 Singles charts.

Irish chart records and achievements
 Jackson had 70 chart entries on the Top 100 Singles charts.

Jackson's Irish number ones
Michael Jackson had 10 number one hits on the Top 100 Singles charts, more than any other solo artist.

Other records and achievement worldwide
Jackson has sold over 278 million records worldwide and he is one of three recording artists (along with Paul McCartney and Phil Collins) and the first American artist who have sold over 100 million records worldwide both as solo artists and (separately) as principal members of a band.
 Jackson is the most successful entertainer in history, according to the Guinness Book of World Records 
 To date, Jackson is the first and only artist to have five of his solo albums sell over 20 million copies worldwide: Off The Wall (20+ million), Thriller  (70 million), Bad (35+ million), Dangerous (32+ million) and HIStory: Past, Present and Future, Book I (20 million) result, Jackson holds the record for artist with highest number of best-selling albums worldwide
 Thriller is the best-selling album of all time with claimed sales of 70 million.
 Jackson has been credited with supporting more charities than any other artist – 39 charitable organisations – either with monetary donations through sponsorships of their projects or participation in their activities.
 Jackson is the Highest-Paid Commercial Spokesperson ever; Pepsi Cola paid Jackson $12 million to do 4 TV commercials in March 1988.
 David O. Selznick's 1940 Best Film Oscar for Gone with the Wind (USA, 1939) was bought by Jackson for $1,542,000 on June 12, 1999, at Sotheby's, New York City. The Academy Awards no longer permits such sales, all but ensuring that it will remain the most expensive Oscar.
 In 1995, Jackson financed the most expensive music video: "Scream". The clip, which co-starred sister Janet Jackson, reportedly cost over US$7 million.
 On November 14, 1991, the debut of Michael Jackson's music video Black or White was broadcast simultaneously in 27 countries, to the largest audience in television history for a music video premiere: an estimated 500 million people.
 Jackson has the two best-selling VHS music videos ever released: "Moonwalker" (1988), and "The Making of Michael Jackson's Thriller (1984).
Jackson's Bad world tour (1987–1989) was the second highest-grossing tour of the 1980s behind Pink Floyd's A Momentary Lapse of Reason Tour, with a gross of $125 million. His 1996–97 HIStory tour grossed $165 million, becoming one of the top five highest-grossing tours of the 1990s and became his highest-grossing concert tour to date. At the time, Jackson had the two highest-grossing tours ever given by a solo artist.
 While the bulk of his sales achievements have come in the fields of pop music and R&B, Jackson has also had success in subgenres. His Dangerous (1991) album (32 million sales worldwide) has been cited as the top-selling new jack swing album, while his Blood on the Dance Floor (6 million sales worldwide) is the biggest selling remix collection.
 Jackson's double album HIStory is the top-selling multiple disc album of all time by a male solo artist. Though estimates of its worldwide sales total range as high as 30 million copies (60 million discs).
 Jackson was once one of the wealthiest artists in the world, with an estimated fortune of more than $750 million. In 2007, the Jackson estate's assets were calculated to be $1,360,839,979, with 85% of that total being Jackson's stake in the Sony/ATV Music Publishing song catalog that includes most of the Beatles' songs. Jackson also had sizeable debts that far outstripped his liquid cash total, which was just .05% of his net worth.
 Following his death, Jackson became the first artist to sell more than 2 million downloads in a week.
 Michael Jackson's This Is It is the top-grossing concert film and the documentary film of all time. The posthumous movie has earned over $260 million worldwide to date. It also set a record for concert films with $103.9 million in worldwide ticket sales in its first five days of release. 
 On March 16, 2010, Sony Music Entertainment signed a record-breaking $250 million deal with Jackson's estate to retain distribution rights to his recordings until 2017 and release seven posthumous albums—some of which will feature unreleased material—over the next decade.
 In August 2010, Jackson became the 44th dancer/choreographer inducted into the National Museum of Dance Hall of Fame, and the hall's first inductee from the world of rock and roll.
 As of 2022, Thriller is the best-selling albums in Mexico based on certifications by AMPROFON.

See also
 List of awards and nominations received by Michael Jackson
 List of best-selling music artists in the United Kingdom in singles sales
 List of most expensive music videos
 List of best-selling albums
 List of best-selling albums in the United States
 Philanthropy of Michael Jackson

References

Michael Jackson
Jackson, Michael